The 1972–73 season was the 71st season in which Dundee competed at a Scottish national level, playing in Division One, where the club would finish in 5th place for the third consecutive season. Domestically, Dundee would also compete in both the Scottish League Cup and the Scottish Cup, where they would get knocked out by Celtic in both the quarter-finals of the League Cup and the semi-finals of the Scottish Cup, with both ties requiring replays. Dundee would also compete in the Texaco Cup, where they would be knocked out by Norwich City in the 1st round.

Scottish Division One 

Statistics provided by Dee Archive.

League table

Scottish League Cup 

Statistics provided by Dee Archive.

Group 7

Group 7 table

Knockout stage

Scottish Cup 

Statistics provided by Dee Archive.

Texaco Cup

Player statistics 
Statistics provided by Dee Archive

|}

See also 

 List of Dundee F.C. seasons

References

External links 

 1972-73 Dundee season on Fitbastats

Dundee F.C. seasons
Dundee